Alberton School is a three-story brick school located in Alberton, Montana, United States which was listed on the National Register of Historic Places on January 13, 1997. From its construction until 1960 it was the only high school within . It continues to serve as a school, and remains architecturally intact.

References

School buildings on the National Register of Historic Places in Montana
National Register of Historic Places in Mineral County, Montana
1919 establishments in Montana
School buildings completed in 1919
Schools in Mineral County, Montana
Public high schools in Montana